The men's 20 kilometres walk was an event at the 1956 Summer Olympics in Melbourne, Australia. There were a total number of 21 participants from 10 nations.

Final classification

References

External links
 Official Report
 Results

M
Racewalking at the Olympics
Men's events at the 1956 Summer Olympics